Sir Peter Richard Lane (born 26 April 1953) is a British High Court judge.

Early life and education 
Lane was educated Worcester Royal Grammar School. He studied at Hertford College, Oxford and took a first-class BA in jurisprudence in 1974. He completed an LLM at University of California, Berkeley in 1975.

Career 
He was called to the bar at Middle Temple in 1976, and practised from 1977 to 1980. He was lecturer in law at QMUL from 1978 to 1980. From 1980 to 1985, he was assistant parliamentary counsel. In 1985, he qualified as a solicitor and served as solicitor and parliamentary agent from 1985 to 2001; he was partner at Rees & Freres from 1987 to 2001. 

He was appointed a part-time immigration adjudicator from 1996 to 2001, becoming full time from 2001 to 2003. From 2003, he served as vice-president and senior immigration judge at the Immigration Appeal Tribunal and in 2010 he was appointed a judge of the Upper Tribunal (Immigration and Asylum Chamber) until 2017. He was legal member of the Special Immigration Appeals Commission from 2005 to 2017. He was President of the First-tier Tribunal (General Regulatory Chamber) from 2014 to 2017 and served as a deputy High Court judge from 2016 to 2017.

High Court appointment 
On 2 October 2017, he was appointed a judge of the High Court and assigned to the Queen's Bench Division. He took the customary knighthood in the same year. He has been president of the Upper Tribunal (Immigration and Asylum Chamber) since 2017.

Personal life 
In 1980, he married Shelley Ilene Munjack (a retired judge), with whom he has one son and one daughter.

References 

Living people
1953 births
21st-century English judges
Knights Bachelor
Alumni of Hertford College, Oxford
UC Berkeley School of Law alumni
Members of the Middle Temple
English solicitors
Academics of Queen Mary University of London
Civil servants in the Office of the Parliamentary Counsel (United Kingdom)
20th-century English judges